Patrick Metcalfe (born November 11, 1998) is a Canadian professional soccer player who currently plays for Fredrikstad.

Club career

Whitecaps FC 2
Metcalfe signed his first professional contract with Whitecaps FC 2 of the United Soccer League on April 21, 2017. He made his debut on May 28, 2017, as a half-time substitute during a 1–2 loss to Real Monarchs. He spent one season with Whitecaps FC 2 before the club ceased operations after the 2017 season.

TSS FC Rovers
After one season with Whitecaps FC 2, Metcalfe signed with TSS FC Rovers of the Premier Development League for the 2018 season.

Whitecaps Development Team
In 2019, Metcalfe signed with Whitecaps Development Team and was called to pre-season with WFC First team to Honolulu and Los Angeles.

Vancouver Whitecaps FC
On January 23, 2020, Metcalfe joined Vancouver's first-team in MLS. At the conclusion of the 2021 Major League Soccer season, Metcalfe's contract option was declined by Vancouver.

Stabæk
In March 2022 Metcalfe signed with Norwegian club Stabæk on a three-year contract.

Frederikstad
In March 2023, Metcalfe would transfer to 1. divisjon side Fredrikstad, signing a two year contract.

International career
Metcalfe is of Filipino descent, and as a result is eligible for both Canada and the Philippines.

Youth
Metcalfe was named to the Canadian U-23 provisional roster for the 2020 CONCACAF Men's Olympic Qualifying Championship on February 26, 2020. He was named to the final squad ahead of the re-scheduled tournament on March 10, 2021.

References

External links
Whitecaps FC Bio

1998 births
Living people
People from Richmond, British Columbia
Canadian sportspeople of Filipino descent
Canadian soccer players
Soccer people from British Columbia
Association football midfielders
Whitecaps FC 2 players
TSS FC Rovers players
Vancouver Whitecaps FC players
USL Championship players
USL League Two players
UBC Thunderbirds soccer players
Homegrown Players (MLS)
Major League Soccer players